Podar International School is a group of schools that is a part of the Podar Education Network that was established in 1927 by Sheth Anandilal Podar, with Mahatma Gandhi as the first President of the trust. The group is headquartered in Mumbai. It offers educational streams such as the Central Board of Secondary Education (CBSE), Council for the Indian School Certificate Examinations (CISCE), Secondary School Certificate (SSC), Cambridge (IGCSE) and International Baccalaureate (IB).

Podar International Schools consist of Pre-Primary schools, Primary and Secondary schools, Junior Colleges, Part-Time courses, and Teacher Training Institutes. The Podar network of schools offers educational streams for the Central Board of Secondary Education (CBSE), Council for the Indian School Certificate Examinations (CICSE), Secondary School Certificate (SSC), Cambridge IGCSE, and International Baccalaureate (IB).

As of January 2021, there are 131 Podar International Schools across India with over 1,60,000 students and 7,600 staff members.

History
Podar International School is a co-ed school. Its first classes were held in 2005 in the Mumbai Suburb of Santacruz West. The school launched interactive E-books on iPad in 2012. The school offers the International Baccalaureate programs for PYP (Grades 1-5) Cambridge Checkpoint and IGCSE (Grades 6-10) an1d the IBDP and A-levels (Grades 11, 12).

Campuses 
After adding 6 new schools in 5 states in 2021, Podar International now has over 136 campuses across 10 states in India.

List of Podar International School in Gujarat

Educational Initiatives 
The Podar International School focuses on technology for education and started teaching students using tablets around 2011, and shifted to digital learning completely between 2015 and 2016 with e-textbooks, e-workbooks and e-notes.

The school promotes technology-based learning through its BetweenUs portal, with a Learning Management System that shares e-versions of the prescribed textbooks with the students. The system also enables teacher-student interaction.

In November 2020, Podar International School announced an Innovation Lab that aims to enable students to learn about robotics, coding, drones, Virtual Reality, and 3D Printing. This lab will be set up across all Podar International School campuses.

Other Initiatives 
In 2010, the school’s Santacruz campus in Mumbai conducted a seminar, along with Ecole Mondiale world School, Juhu, to teach students how to read nutritional labels, how the contents affect one’s health, and how to detect food that has gone past its expiry date.

Podar International School, Mumbai, conducted a city-wide survey of the usage of smartphones and its effects on the relationship between parents and children. Over 5,000 parents and 2000 school-going children participated in the survey in December 2013. The results showed that children often felt their parents loved their phones more than them.

The school’s Indore campus hosted the CBSE Master Training Workshop on ‘Happy Classrooms’ in December 2019	 where over 50 principals and vice-principals from Madhya Pradesh, Gujarat and Rajasthan participated.

The school’s Nagpur campus conducted a virtual run, E–Marathon for its students, parents, grandparents and teachers, in July 2020. The run was conducted to convey a message of keeping oneself fit and healthy amidst the outbreak of COVID-19.  Between 6 am to 10 am, more than 1,000 participants covered the specified distance, undertaking all safety measures, recording their timings on the suggested fitness app, and uploading the snapshots of their run summary on the given link.

The school’s Nagpur campus conducted a virtual run, E–Marathon for its students, parents, grandparents and teachers, in July 2020. The run was conducted to convey a message of keeping oneself fit and healthy amidst the outbreak of COVID-19. Between 6 am to 10 am, more than 1,000 participants covered the specified distance, undertaking all safety measures, recording their timings on the suggested fitness app, and uploading the snapshots of their run summary on the given link.

Post COVID-19 
In October 2021, 62 out of 139 schools across the country have been partially opened for students.

Recognition 

 Podar International School’s Santacruz, Mumbai campus has been ranked among the top 10 schools in Mumbai West in the ‘HT Top Schools Survey’ conducted by Hindustan Times in 2016, 2017, 2018, and 2019. The survey also lists the Santacruz campus among the top 10 international schools in Mumbai city.   The same survey in 2017 listed Podar International School, Nerul campus among the top 10 schools in Navi Mumbai.
 The school’s parent brand, Podar Education Network, was awarded ‘The Economic Times Best Education Brands 2018’ along with 21 other education brands. 
 The pre-school chain of the Podar International School, known as Podar Jumbo Kids, was awarded the Best Pre School Chain of the Year in the annual ScooNews Global Education Awards 2018. 
 One of the franchises of the pre-school chain located in Andheri East, Mumbai, was ranked 3rd in the franchise category of EducationWorld - India’s nationwide pre-school survey in 2018.
 The school’s Santacruz campus was ranked amongst the top 10 international day schools in EW India School Rankings 2019-20 survey.
The school’s Santacruz campus has been ranked no. 6 among the top schools in the state boards category in the Times School Survey 2020. In the same survey, the school’s Ambernath campus has been named among the top 5 emerging schools in Mumbai in the National ICSE & CBSE curriculum category.

Student Achievements

International 
A 9-student team from the group’s RN Podar school campus in Mumbai won at the ‘Beamline for Schools’ competition, 2018, conducted by CERN, the Geneva-based European Organisation for Nuclear Research, and became, along with International School of Manila, Philippines, the first Asian school teams to win the competition since its inception.

In October 2019, a female student of the Podar International School, Mumbai was one of the ‘all-girls’ team that represented India in a robotics competition, First Global Challenge 2019, held in Dubai.

National 

 3 students from the Mumbai campuses of the Podar International School were awarded ‘Top in the World’ by Cambridge Assessment International Education for their exceptional performance across subjects in the Cambridge exams held in 2016-17.
 In the Cambridge exams in 2018-2019, 9 students from the Mumbai campuses of Podar International School were conferred ‘Outstanding Cambridge Learner Awards’ by Cambridge International for their exceptional performance across different subjects.
 On 10 February 2018, students of the Podar International School, Mumbai won the junior and senior categories in the Mumbai round of ‘The Hindu Young World Quiz’ held at Bombay Teachers’ Training College in Colaba.
 In December 2018, 4 students of Podar International School, Shivamogga campus bagged the ‘Child Scientist’ award at the National Children’s Science Congress held in Bhubaneswar.

CSR Activities 

 In 2016, in an initiative to reduce e-waste pollution, students of the Podar International School collected disposable batteries in a plastic container, so that they could be recycled.
 On 1 December 2018, celebrated as World Aids Day, Podar International School, Mangaluru, organized a marathon themed, ‘All for Mangalore & Mangalore for All, World AIDS Day-run For A Cause’, to help Snehadeep, an NGO taking care of women’s and children, especially those who are HIV infected.
 On 29 February 2020, Podar International School, Hebbal campus students held a "Happy Living" rally in Mysuru to spread public awareness on basic rules such as the importance of water conservation, following traffic safety, and avoiding junk food in order to lead a happy and healthy lifestyle.
 In March 2020, under its "Giving Back" initiative, students of Podar International School, Hebbal, Mysuru presented the nurses working at Sri Jayadeva Institute of Cardiovascular Sciences and Research handmade thanksgiving cards acknowledging their selfless service.
 In February 2020, Podar International School, Mumbai students as part of a water wastage audit, undertook an exercise to inspect all taps and pipes at the school and in their homes to check for water wastage through leakages.
 3 March 2020, celebrated as World Wildlife Day, Podar International School, Mumbai, received a Compassionate School Award, and some of its 10-year-old students received Compassionate Kid awards from PETA India for working on a moving music video titled "Don’t Kill For Fun" that addressed the issue of trophy hunting.

See also 
 Podar World School
 Podar Group of Schools

References

External links 
 https://www.podareducation.org/
 https://www.podar.org/

International schools in Mumbai